Nodirbek Abdusattorov (born 18 September 2004) is an Uzbek chess grandmaster and the 2021 World Rapid Chess Champion. A chess prodigy, he qualified for the grandmaster title at the age of 13 years, 1 month, and 11 days. FIDE awarded him the title in April 2018.

Abdusattorov won the World Rapid Chess Championship 2021, becoming the youngest ever World Rapid Champion at 17 years, 3 months and the youngest ever world chess champion in any time format, breaking the youngest World Blitz Champion record of Magnus Carlsen, who was 18 years old when he won the World Blitz Chess Championship 2009. Abdusattorov defeated Carlsen to win the 2021 Championship. In 2022, Abdusattorov played board 1 for Uzbekistan at the 44th Chess Olympiad where his team won gold and he won an individual silver medal for his board 1 performance.

Chess career

Early chess career
In 2012, Abdusattorov won the Under 8 division of the World Youth Chess Championships in Maribor, Slovenia. In 2014, at nine years old, he beat two grandmasters, Andrey Zhigalko and Rustam Khusnutdinov, in the 8th Georgy Agzamov Memorial tournament, held in his home city of Tashkent. On 27 June 2020, Abdusattorov placed 2nd–6th in the 1st Mukhtar Ismagambetov Memorial along with Shakhriyar Mamedyarov, Dmitriy Bocharov, Kazybek Nogerbek, and Davit Maghalashvili, with a score of 8.5/11.
In the FIDE rating list of May 2015, he set a new record for the youngest player to enter the top 100 juniors, at eleven years old.

2021  
In 2021, Abdusattorov won in the first group of the PNWCC Super G60.

He qualified for the Chess World Cup 2021 where, ranked 69th, after receiving a walkover in the first round, he defeated Aravindh Chithambaram 1.5–0.5 in the second round and beat fourth seed Anish Giri 3–1 in tiebreaks of the third round before losing to Vasif Durarbayli 4–2 in the 4th round.

In September 2021, Abdusattorov took second place (behind Anish Giri) at the Tolstoy Cup tournament organized by the State Leo Tolstoy Museum-Estate "Yasnaya Polyana" and the Chess Federation of Russia.

In December 2021, Abdusattorov won the El Llobregat Open held in Spain with a score of 7.0/9.

He followed that up with another open tournament victory in Spain, winning the Sitges Open, held from 13 to 23 December, with a score of 8.0/10 and edging out Ivan Cheparinov and Dmitrij Kollars in blitz tiebreaks for first place.

In December 2021, Abdusattorov took part in the 2021 FIDE World Rapid Championship, achieving a preliminary score of 9.5/13 in a four-way tie for first place, while defeating among others the reigning world chess champion Magnus Carlsen and Fabiano Caruana. With a subsequent win of 1.5/2 over Ian Nepomniachtchi in the tie-breaks, Abdusattorov won the Rapid Championship and became the youngest Rapid World Champion in history and the youngest World Champion overall in any of the three recognized time control formats.

2022 
In May 2022, he won Sharjah Masters  with a 2834 performance rating and in August, he played board 1 for Uzbekistan at the 44th Chess Olympiad in Chennai, where his team won gold on tiebreaks after winning 8 matches and drawing 3 for a score of 19 (tied with Armenia).  He won an individual silver medal for his board 1 performance (+7-1=3) behind Gukesh D and had a tournament performance rating of 2803.

2023
In January 2023, Abdusattorov participated in the Tata Steel tournament, in which he tied for second with Magnus Carlsen. Going into the last round he topped the table, but was overtaken by Anish Giri.

References

Notes

External links
 
 

2004 births
Living people
Chess grandmasters
Uzbekistani chess players
World Youth Chess Champions
Sportspeople from Tashkent